This is the discography of Japanese pop group Ikimonogakari, who have released three Indie albums prior to 2006, and seven studio albums, three compilation albums, and numerous singles since joining Epic Records in 2006.

Albums

Indie albums

Studio albums

Compilation albums

Singles

Unreleased tracks

Other songs
 (released on 8 March 2006 on SME Records): #10 Get Crazy!(In Japanese)

References

External links
 Official Discography 

Discographies of Japanese artists